Laurie Leask (14 June 1912 – 7 May 1981) was an Australian rules footballer who played with South Melbourne in the Victorian Football League (VFL).

Notes

External links 

1912 births
1981 deaths
Australian rules footballers from Victoria (Australia)
Sydney Swans players